Mersenne's laws are laws describing the frequency of oscillation of a stretched string or monochord, useful in musical tuning and musical instrument construction.

Overview
The equation was first proposed by French mathematician and music theorist Marin Mersenne in his 1636 work Harmonie universelle. Mersenne's laws govern the construction and operation of string instruments, such as pianos and harps, which must accommodate the total tension force required to keep the strings at the proper pitch. Lower strings are thicker, thus having a greater mass per length. They typically have lower tension. Guitars are a familiar exception to this: string tensions are similar, for playability, so lower string pitch is largely achieved with increased mass per length. Higher-pitched strings typically are thinner, have higher tension, and may be shorter. "This result does not differ substantially from Galileo's, yet it is rightly known as Mersenne's law," because Mersenne physically proved their truth through experiments (while Galileo considered their proof impossible). "Mersenne investigated and refined these relationships by experiment but did not himself originate them". Though his theories are correct, his measurements are not very exact, and his calculations were greatly improved by Joseph Sauveur (1653–1716) through the use of acoustic beats and metronomes.

Equations
The natural frequency is:

a) Inversely proportional to the length of the string (the law of Pythagoras),
b) Proportional to the square root of the stretching force, and
c) Inversely proportional to the square root of the mass per length.

 (equation 26)

 (equation 27)

 (equation 28)

Thus, for example, all other properties of the string being equal, to make the note one octave higher (2/1) one would need either to decrease its length by half (1/2), to increase the tension to the square (4), or to decrease its mass per length by the inverse square (1/4).

These laws are derived from Mersenne's equation 22:

The formula for the fundamental frequency is:

where f is the frequency, L is the length, F is the force and μ is the mass per length.

Similar laws were not developed for pipes and wind instruments at the same time since Mersenne's laws predate the conception of wind instrument pitch being dependent on longitudinal waves rather than "percussion".

See also
Cycloid
Long-string instrument
Overtone
Standing wave

Notes

References

External links

Musical tuning
Empirical laws
Eponyms